Teckberg is a mountain at Landkreis Esslingen in Baden-Württemberg, Germany, with an elevation of 775 metres. Situated on top is castle Teck.

Geography 

The Teckberg jumps from Swabian Jura edge from about 3 km towards the north front and overlooks the Albvorland to 350 m, the Lauter (Neckar) valley to 400 m. He is flanked of the approximately 602 m high foothills Hörnle and Hohenbol north and northwest. Both Foothills include smokestacks of the Swabian volcano. North below the Hörnle is the glider area Teck (between Dettingen unter Teck and Bissingen an der Teck).
The slope of the Teckberg formed by the Yellow Rock, a Schwammriff the Jura sea of bright lime. Under the "Gelber Fels", is the 31 m long and  45 m high Veronikahöhle, which is connected through columns with Verena-Beutlins-Loch. East of the Gelber Fels (Yellow Rock) three grave mounds indicate from the Hallstatt period (800-400 BC) the early settlement of the Teckberg. It was only in 1937 discovered during construction work and was explored in 1977. During excavations in Sibyllenloch 1898/99 over 2,000 skeletal remains of cave bear, cave lion, cave hyena and wild horse were found. So many conclusions about the glacial fauna could be drawn.

Nature Reserve
With regulation of the Regierungspräsidium Stuttgart from 9 November 1999, the entire Teckberg  with an area of 386.0 hectares was reported as nature reserve. It was managed to preserve and promote an unusually varied cultural landscape with wet and dry meadows, orchards, hedges, forest fringes, alleys, groves, solitary trees, rocks, caves, springs and rare natural forest communities. These habitats provide a quality habitat for a variety of partly endangered plant and animal species. In the versatile natural area botanists could show 464 different plant species.

Literature 
(in German)
Wolfgang Roser, Jürgen Mauch: Der Schwäbische Vulkan. GO Druck-Media-Verlag, Kirchheim unter Teck 2003, .
Konrad Theiss: Der Kreis Esslingen. Theiss, Stuttgart 1978, .
Naturschutzgebiet Teck, hrsg. von der Landesanstalt für Umweltschutz Baden-Württemberg (LfU). Verlag Regionalkultur, Ubstadt-Weiher 2000. .
 Reinhard Wolf, Ulrike Kreh (Hrsg.): Die Naturschutzgebiete im Regierungsbezirk Stuttgart. Thorbecke, Ostfildern 2007, S. 492–495

Mountains and hills of Baden-Württemberg
Mountains and hills of the Swabian Jura
Mountains under 1000 metres
Protected areas of Europe